Slovinky is a village and municipality in the Spišská Nová Ves District in the Košice Region of central-eastern Slovakia. In 2011, it had a population of 1,911 inhabitants.

History
In historical records the village was first mentioned in 1368.

Geography
The village lies at an altitude of 442 metres and covers an area of 46.44 km².

External links
http://msslovinky.sk
http://www.obecslovinky.sk/
http://www.statistics.sk/mosmis/eng/run.html
http://en.e-obce.sk/obec/slovinky/slovinky.html

Villages and municipalities in Spišská Nová Ves District